Castanopsis hystrix or Patle katus is a species of evergreen broadleaf tree, which grows up to 30 meters in height.

The tree is found in subtropical broadleaved evergreen forests, ranging from the eastern Himalayas of Nepal, Bhutan, and northeastern India, across Indochina (Cambodia, Laos, Myanmar, Thailand, Vietnam), southern China (Fujian, Guangdong, Guangxi, Guizhou, Hainan, southwestern Hunan, southeastern Tibet, and southern Yunnan), and Taiwan. It ranges up to 2400 meters elevation in the Himalayas, and up to 1600 meters elevation in southern China. It thrives in moist soils, and is often found in association with trees of family Lauraceae.

External links

Castanopsis hystrix (Plants for a Future Database)
Castanopsis hystrix in Flora of China

References

hystrix
Trees of China
Flora of the Indian subcontinent
Trees of Indo-China
Trees of Taiwan